Nellithope is a legislative assembly constituency in the Union territory of Puducherry in India.
 Nellithope assembly constituency is a part of Puducherry (Lok Sabha constituency).

Members of Legislative Assembly 

By election

Election results

2021

See also
 List of constituencies of the Puducherry Legislative Assembly
 Puducherry district

Election Result

2021 Assembly election

References 

Assembly constituencies of Puducherry